Josef Zehnder (born 25 March 1944) is a Swiss ski jumper. He competed at the 1964 Winter Olympics, the 1968 Winter Olympics and the 1972 Winter Olympics.

References

1944 births
Living people
Swiss male ski jumpers
Olympic ski jumpers of Switzerland
Ski jumpers at the 1964 Winter Olympics
Ski jumpers at the 1968 Winter Olympics
Ski jumpers at the 1972 Winter Olympics